Operating signals are a type of brevity code used in operational communication among radio and telegraph operators. For example:

 Prosigns for Morse code
 92 Code: telegraph brevity codes
 Q code: initially developed for commercial radiotelegraph communication and adopted by other radio services  
 QN Signals: published by the ARRL and used in Amateur radio 
 R code and S Code: published by the British Post Office for coastal wireless stations and ships
  X code: used by European military services in wireless telegraphy
  Z code: used in early radiotelegraph communication

See also
 Brevity code
 SINPO code - code used to describe the quality of radio transmissions, especially in reception reports written by shortwave listeners
 R-S-T system- information about the quality of a radio signal being received. Used by amateur radio operators, shortwave listeners.
 Morse code abbreviations
 Telegraphese

External links
 Nonsecret Code: An Overview of Early Telegraph Codes

References